Mishin (masculine) or Mishina (feminine) is a Russian surname that is derived from Misha, a diminutive for the male given name Mikhail, and literally means Misha's. Mishina is also an unrelated Japanese surname. Notable people with the surname include:

Mishin
Alexei Mishin (born 1941), figure skater and coach
Alexei Mishin (wrestler) (born 1979)
Andrey Mishin (born 1979), boxer
Dmitry Mishin (1919–1998), physicist
Sergey Mishin (born 1958), weightlifter
Vasily Mishin (1917–2001), engineer
Vladimir Mishin (1888–1942), footballer

Mishina
Anastasia Mishina, Russian pair skater
Masumi Mishina, Japanese softball player
Tatiana Mishina, former Soviet figure skater

Fictional characters
Eikichi Mishina, character in the video game Persona 2

Japanese-language surnames
Russian-language surnames